Ricardo Cardoso (5 August 1963 – 28 April 1991) was a Brazilian judoka. He competed in the men's half-lightweight event at the 1988 Summer Olympics. Cardoso committed suicide in 1991. His brother is Olympic gold medallist Rogério Sampaio.

References

External links
 

1963 births
1991 suicides
Brazilian male judoka
Olympic judoka of Brazil
Judoka at the 1988 Summer Olympics
Sportspeople from Santos, São Paulo
Suicides in Brazil
20th-century Brazilian people